Timarcha is a genus of leaf beetles in the family Chrysomelidae, with more than 100 described species in three subgenera. The most widely known species is T. tenebricosa, the bloody-nosed beetle. All species are black, wingless organisms. Timarcha are herbivorous species, living mostly on plants belonging to Rubiaceae and Plumbaginaceae, although a few can feed on Brassicaceae and Rosaceae. Timarcha is the only member of the tribe Timarchini.

Species
These 20 species belong to the genus Timarcha:

 Timarcha affinis Laboissière, 1937 g
 Timarcha cerdo Stål, 1863 i c g
 Timarcha cornuta Bechyné, 1944 g
 Timarcha cyanescens Fairmaire, 1862 g
 Timarcha coarcticollis Fairmaire, 1873 g
 Timarcha daillei Laboissière, 1939 g
 Timarcha goettingensis (Linnaeus, 1758) g
 Timarcha insparsa
 Timarcha interstitialis Fairmaire, 1862 g
 Timarcha intricata Haldeman, 1853 i c g b
 Timarcha italica Herrich-Schäffer, 1838 g
 Timarcha lugens
 Timarcha marginicollis
 Timarcha maritima Perris, 1855 g
 Timarcha metallica (Laicharting, 1781) g
 Timarcha monticola Dufour, 1851 g
 Timarcha nicaeensis A.Villa & G.B.Villa, 1835 g
 Timarcha obsoleta Laboissière, 1937 g
 Timarcha recticollis Fairmaire, 1862 g
 Timarcha sardea (Villa, 1835) g
 Timarcha sinuatocollis Fairmaire, 1862 g
 Timarcha strangulata Fairmaire, 1862 g
 Timarcha temperei Jeanne, 1965 g
 Timarcha tenebricosa (Fabricius, 1775) g (Bloody-nosed beetle)

Data sources: i = ITIS, c = Catalogue of Life, g = GBIF, b = Bugguide.net

References

External links

List of 111 species

Wingless beetles
Chrysomelinae
Chrysomelidae genera
Taxa named by George Samouelle